Ragano is a surname. Notable people with the surname include:

 Frank Ragano (1923–1998), American lawyer
 Maurizio Ragano (died 1640), Roman Catholic prelate

See also
 Ragan (surname)